Joseph Kwadjo is a former Universal Boxing Organisation (UBO) Intercontinental and IBF Australasian Super middleweight champion.

References

1985 births
Living people
Place of birth missing (living people)
Ghanaian male boxers